The film industry or motion picture industry comprises the technological and commercial institutions of filmmaking, i.e., film production companies, film studios, cinematography, animation, film production, screenwriting, pre-production, post production, film festivals, distribution, and actors. Though the expense involved in making films almost immediately led film production to concentrate under the auspices of standing production companies, advances in affordable filmmaking equipment, as well as an expansion of opportunities to acquire investment capital from outside the film industry itself, have allowed independent film production to evolve.

In 2019, the global box office was worth . When including box office and home entertainment revenue, the global film industry was worth  in 2018. Hollywood is the world's oldest national film industry, and largest in terms of box office gross revenue. Indian cinema is the largest national film industry in terms of the number of films produced, with 2,446 feature films produced annually . , Chinese cinema has the highest annual ticket sales with 1,156 million tickets sold.

Modern film industry 

, the largest markets by box office were, in decreasing order, the United States, China, Japan, South Korea, the United Kingdom, France, and India. , the countries with the largest number of film productions were India, Nigeria, and the United States. In Europe, significant centers of movie production are Italy, France, Germany, Spain, and the United Kingdom.

United States 

The cinema of the United States, often generally referred to as Hollywood, has had a profound effect on cinema across the world since the early 20th century. The United States cinema (Hollywood) is the oldest film industry in the world and also the largest film industry in terms of revenue. Hollywood is the primary nexus of the U.S. film industry with established film study facilities such as the American Film Institute, LA Film School and NYFA being established in the area. However, four of the six major film studios are owned by East Coast companies. The major film studios of Hollywood including Metro-Goldwyn-Mayer, 20th Century Fox, and Paramount Pictures are the primary source of the most commercially successful movies in the world, such as  The Sound of Music (1965), Star Wars (1977), Titanic (1997), and Avatar (2009).

American film studios today collectively generate several hundred films every year, making the United States one of the most prolific producers of films in the world. Only The Walt Disney Company — which owns the Walt Disney Studios — is fully based in Southern California. And while Sony Pictures Entertainment is headquartered in Culver City, California, its parent company, the Sony Corporation, is headquartered in Tokyo, Japan. Most shooting now takes place in California, New York, Louisiana, Georgia and North Carolina. New Mexico, especially in the Albuquerque and Santa Fe areas, had been an increasingly popular state for filming; Breaking Bad, the television show was set there, and movies such as No Country for Old Men and Rust were shot there. Between 2009 and 2015, Hollywood consistently grossed $10 billion (or more) annually. Hollywood's award ceremony, the Academy Awards, officially known as The Oscars, is held by the Academy of Motion Picture Arts and Sciences (AMPAS) every year and as of 2019, more than 3,000 Oscars have been awarded.
On 27 October 1911, Nestor Film Company established Hollywood's first permanent film studio. The California weather allowed for year-round filming. In 1912, Universal Studios was formed, merging Nestor and several other motion picture companies, including Independent Moving Pictures (IMP).

France 

France is the birthplace of cinema and was responsible for many of its significant contributions to the art form and the film-making process itself. Several important cinematic movements, including the Nouvelle Vague, began in the country. It is noted for having a particularly strong film industry, due in part to protections afforded by the French government.

French cinema is sometimes intertwined with the cinema of foreign nations. Directors from nations such as Poland (Roman Polanski, Krzysztof Kieślowski, and Andrzej Żuławski), Argentina (Gaspar Noé and Edgardo Cozarinsky), Russia (Alexandre Alexeieff, Anatole Litvak), Austria (Michael Haneke), and Georgia (Géla Babluani, Otar Iosseliani) are prominent in the ranks of French cinema. Conversely, some French directors have had careers in other countries, such as Luc Besson, Jacques Tourneur, or Francis Veber in the United States.

Another element supporting this fact is that Paris has the highest density of cinemas in the world, measured by the number of movie theaters per inhabitant, and that in most "downtown Paris" movie theaters, foreign movies which would be secluded to "art houses" cinemas in other places are shown alongside "mainstream" works. Philippe Binant realized, on 2 February 2000, the first digital cinema projection in Europe, with the DLP CINEMA technology developed by Texas Instruments, in Paris. Paris also boasts the Cité du cinéma, a major studio north of the city, and Disney Studio, a theme park devoted to the cinema and the third theme park near the city behind Disneyland and Parc Asterix.

In 2015, France saw a record-breaking 300 feature-length films produced. US and UK films only represented 44.9% of total admissions in 2014. This is largely due to the commercial strength of domestic productions, which accounted for 44,5% of admissions in 2014 (35.5% in 2015; 35.3% in 2016). In the mid-2000s, the French film industry was described as being "closer to being entirely self-sufficient than any other country in Europe, recovering around 80 – 90% of their budget in revenues generated from the domestic market". In 2018, French films had an international box office of €237m with 40 million admissions (down 52% from 2017), with Italy being the top foreign market.

China 

The cinema of China is one of three distinct historical threads of Chinese-language cinema together with the cinema of Hong Kong and the cinema of Taiwan. Cinema was introduced in China in 1896 and the first Chinese film, Dingjun Mountain, was made in 1905, with the film industry being centered on Shanghai in the first decades. China is the home of one of the largest film studios in the world, the Hengdian World Studios, and in 2010 it had the third largest film industry by number of feature films produced annually. For the next decade the production companies were mainly foreign-owned, and the domestic film industry was centered on Shanghai, a thriving entrepot and the largest city in the Far East. In 1913, the first independent Chinese screenplay, The Difficult Couple, was filmed in Shanghai by Zheng Zhengqiu and Zhang Shichuan.

As the Sixth Generation gained international exposure, many subsequent films were joint ventures and projects with international backers, but remained quite resolutely low-key and low budget. Jia's Platform (2000) was funded in part by Takeshi Kitano's production house, while his Still Life was shot on HD video. Still Life was a surprise addition and Golden Lion winner of the 2006 Venice International Film Festival. Still Life, which concerns provincial workers around the Three Gorges region, sharply contrasts with the works of Fifth Generation Chinese directors like Zhang Yimou and Chen Kaige who were at the time producing House of Flying Daggers (2004) and The Promise (2005). It featured no star of international renown and was acted mostly by non-professionals. In 2012 the country became the second-largest market in the world by box office receipts. In 2014, the gross box office in China was ¥29.6 billion (US$4.82 billion), with domestic films having a share of 55%. China has also become a major hub of business for Hollywood studios.

In 2018, China's gross box office was US$8.9 Billion
In 2013, China's gross box office was ¥21.8 billion (US$3.6 billion), the second-largest film market in the world by box office receipts It increased to $4.8 Billion in 2014 box office grosser in film industry. Due to the COVID-19 pandemic, in 2020 China overtook North America as world's biggest box office, being the first country to achieve this status. China retained this status in 2021. However, in 2022, North America once again overtook China as the global box office's biggest market.

India 

India is the largest producer of films in the world and second oldest film industry in the world. The country is home to one of the most important city in the global film industry, Mumbai (previously Bombay). In 2009 India produced a total of 2,961 films on celluloid; this figure includes 1,288 feature films. Besides being the largest producer of films in the world, India also has the largest number of admissions. Indian film industry is multi-lingual and the largest in the world in terms of ticket sales but 3rd largest in terms of revenue mainly due to having among the lowest ticket prices in the world. The industry is viewed mainly by a vast film-going Indian public, and Indian films have been gaining increasing popularity in the rest of the world—notably in countries with large numbers of expatriate Indians. Indian film industry is also the dominant source of films and entertainment in its neighboring countries of South Asia. The three largest film  industries in India are Hindi cinema, Telugu cinema and Tamil cinema. The Hindi film industry mostly concentrated in Mumbai (Bombay), and is commonly referred to as Bollywood, a portmanteau of Bombay and Hollywood. Telugu cinema is primarily concentrated in Hyderabad and is commonly referred to as Tollywood. Kannada cinema, also known as Sandalwood, is concentrated in Bengaluru. The Tamil film industry i.e. Kollywood is mostly concentrated in Chennai. The Malayalam film industry i.e. Malayalam cinema is concentrated in the state of Kerala.

Besides the mainstream commercial movies, India also offers a different approach to cinema- the parallel cinema.The parallel cinema movement originated in West Bengal around the 1950s. Parallel cinema is a blanket term designated to a certain type of films that stray away from the conventions of popular mainstream cinema.Parallel cinema has assumed various forms throughout the years. Filmmakers associated with parallel cinema are Satyajit Ray, Mrinal Sen, Ritwik Ghatak. Parallel films are characterized by their rejection of popular forms like the songs and fight sequences, their affinity for rural settings, use of method actors and toned down colour palettes. Some examples of such movies are Raincoat, Dhobi Ghat, Mithya.

Indian films have garnered popularity not only in the domestic market but also in the international markets with Dangal having an overseas gross revenue of $260 million, Secret Superstar, and Bajrangi Bhaijaan with a gross revenue of $80.4 million, and Baahubali: The Beginning and Baahubali 2: The Conclusion, a blockbuster duology from Telugu cinema grossing over $370 million globally.

The other largest film industries are Malayalam cinema, Bengali cinema (cinema of West Bengal) and Marathi cinema, primarily located in Kochi, Kolkata and Mumbai respectively. The remaining majority portion is spread across northern, western, eastern and southern India (with Gujarati, Punjabi, Odia, Bhojpuri, Assamese Cinema). However, there are several smaller centers of Indian film industries in regional languages centered in the states where those languages are spoken. Indian cinema encloses a number of several artforms like Indian classical music, folk music of different regions throughout the country, Indian classical dance, folk dance and much more. Bollywood, Tollywood and Kollywood forms the largest portion of the Indian film industry and is viewed all over the Indian Subcontinent, and is increasingly popular in UK, United States, Australia, New Zealand, Southeast Asia, Africa, the Gulf countries, European countries, East Asia and China. The largest film studio complex in the world is Ramoji Film City located at Hyderabad, India, which opened in 1996 and measures 674 ha (1,666 acres). Comprising 47 sound stages, it has permanent sets ranging from railway stations to temples.

By 1986, India's annual film output had increased from 741 films produced annually to 833 films annually, making India the world's largest film producer. , Bollywood represents 45℅ of Indian net box office revenue, while Telugu and Tamil cinema represent 36%, and the rest of the regional film industries constitute 21% of Indian cinema. By 2021, Telugu cinema (Tollywood) has overtaken Hindi cinema (Bollywood) and emerged as the largest film industry in India in terms of box-office.

United Kingdom 

The United Kingdom has had a significant film industry for over a century. While film production reached an all-time high in 1936, the "golden age" of British cinema is usually thought to have occurred in the 1940s, during which the directors David Lean, Michael Powell, (with Emeric Pressburger) and Carol Reed produced their most highly acclaimed work. Many British actors have achieved worldwide fame and critical success, such as Maggie Smith, Roger Moore, Michael Caine, Sean Connery, Daniel Day-Lewis, Gary Oldman, and Kate Winslet. Some of the films with the largest ever box office returns have been made in the United Kingdom, including the third and fourth highest-grossing film series (Harry Potter and James Bond).

The first moving picture was shot in Leeds by Louis Le Prince in 1888 and the first moving pictures developed on celluloid film were made in Hyde Park, London in 1889 by British inventor William Friese Greene, who patented the process in 1890.

Two of the top eight highest-grossing films worldwide of all time have some British historical, cultural or creative dimensions: Titanic (1997), Harry Potter and the Deathly Hallows – Part 2 (2011), The Lord of the Rings: The Return of the King (2003), made in New Zealand, and Pirates of the Caribbean: Dead Man's Chest (2005). Adding four more Harry Potter films and one more Lord of the Rings movie, plus the Tim Burton version of Alice in Wonderland (2010), and more than half of the top twenty most financially successful films, had a substantial British dimension.

British influence can also be seen with the 'English Cycle' of Disney animated films, which include Alice in Wonderland (1951), Peter Pan (1953), One Hundred and One Dalmatians (1961), The Sword in the Stone (1963), and The Jungle Book (1967). Disney first became interested in live-action films as a means of using financial reserves which had built up in Britain, and could not be repatriated owing to exchange controls, by making two films from Scottish and English sources. These were Treasure Island (1950) and The Story of Robin Hood and His Merrie Men (1952), which were both successes at the box office. The studio continued to draw on British source material for its animated films after Walt Disney's death in 1967, with the cartoon feature films Robin Hood (1973), The Rescuers (1976) and The Many Adventures of Winnie the Pooh (1977), one of many Disney to draw on A. A. Milne's characters.

In the 1970s and 1980s, British studios established a reputation for great special effects in films such as Superman (1978), Alien (1979), and Batman (1989). Some of this reputation was founded on the core of talent brought together for the filming of 2001: A Space Odyssey (1968) who subsequently worked together on series and feature films for Gerry Anderson. The Bristol-based Aardman Animations is known for its stop-motion animation.

In late 1998, Channel 4 launched their free-to-air film channel Film4 – a channel specifically designed to show films. It broadcasts from 11:00am BST and competes with pay television film network Sky Cinema.

The London-based visual effects company Framestore, with Tim Webber the visual effects supervisor, have worked on the films The Dark Knight (2008) and Gravity (2013), with new techniques involved in Gravity taking three years to complete.

Philippines
Cinema of the Philippines   began with the introduction of the first moving pictures to the country on August 31, 1897, at the Salón de Pertierra in Manila. The following year, local scenes were shot on film for the first time by a Spaniard, Antonio Ramos, using the Lumiere Cinematograph. While most early filmmakers and producers in the country were mostly wealthy enterprising foreigners and expatriates, on September 12, 1919, Dalagang Bukid (Country Maiden), a movie based on a popular musical play, was the first movie made and shown by Filipino filmmaker José Nepomuceno. Dubbed as the "Father of Philippine Cinema," his work marked the start of cinema as an art form in the Philippines.

Poland 

The history of Cinema of Poland is almost as long as the history of cinematography, and it has universally recognized achievements, even though Polish films tend to be less commercially available than films from several other European nations.

After World War II, the communist government built an auteur-based national cinema, trained hundreds of new directors and empowered them to make films. Filmmakers like Roman Polański, Krzysztof Kieślowski, Agnieszka Holland, Andrzej Wajda, Andrzej Żuławski, Andrzej Munk, and Jerzy Skolimowski impacted the development of Polish film-making.  In more recent years, the industry has been producer-led with finance being the key to a film being made, and with many independent filmmakers of all genres, Polish productions tend to be more inspired by American film.

The Polish Film School was under heavy influence of Italian neorealists. It took advantage of the liberal changes in Poland after 1956 Polish October to portray the complexity of Polish history during World War II and German occupation. Among the most important topics were the generation of former Home Army soldiers and their role in post-war Poland and the national tragedies like the German concentration camps and the Warsaw Uprising. The political changes allowed the group to speak more openly of the recent history of Poland. However, the rule of censorship was still strong when it comes to history after 1945 and there were very few films on the contemporary events. This marked the major difference between the members of the Polish Film School and Italian neorealists.

The Polish Film School was the first to underline the national character of Poles and one of the first artistic movements in Central Europe to openly oppose the official guidelines of Socialist realism. The members of the movement tend to underline the role of individual as opposed to collectivity. There were two trends within the movement: young directors such as Andrzej Wajda generally studied the idea of heroism, while another group (the most notable being Andrzej Munk) analysed the Polish character via irony, humor and a dissection of national myths.

Nigeria 

The cinema of Nigeria, often referred to informally as Nollywood is the cinema of Nigeria. The Nigerian Film Industry is the largest movie industry globally in terms of output, and is the third largest, in terms of overall revenues generated. Cinema of Nigeria Its history dates back to as early as the late 19th century and into the colonial era in the early 20th century. The history and development of the Nigerian motion picture industry is sometimes generally classified in four main eras: the Colonial era, Golden Age, Video film era and the emerging New Nigerian cinema.

Film as a medium first arrived in Nigeria in the late 19th century, in the form of peephole viewing of motion picture devices. These were soon replaced in the early 20th century with improved motion picture exhibition devices, with the first set of films screened at the Glover Memorial Hall in Lagos from 12 to 22 August 1903. The earliest feature film made in Nigeria is 1926's Palaver produced by Geoffrey Barkas; the film was also the first film ever to feature Nigerian actors in a speaking role. As of 1954, mobile cinema vans played to at least 3.5 million people in Nigeria, and films being produced by the Nigerian Film Unit were screened for free at the 44 available cinemas. The first film entirely copyrighted to the Nigerian Film unit is Fincho (1957) by Sam Zebba; which is also the first Nigerian film to be shot in colour.

After Nigeria's independence in 1960, the cinema business rapidly expanded, with new cinema houses being established. As a result, Nigerian films in theaters increased in the late 1960s into the 1970s, especially productions from Western Nigeria, owing to former theater practitioners such as Hubert Ogunde and Moses Olaiya transitioning into the big screen. In 1972, the Indigenization Decree was issued by Yakubu Gowon, which demands the transfer of ownership of about a total of 300 film theaters from their foreign owners to Nigerians, which resulted in more Nigerians playing active roles in the cinema and film. The oil boom of 1973 through 1978 also contributed immensely to the spontaneous boost of the cinema culture in Nigeria, as the increased purchasing power in Nigeria made a wide range of citizens to have disposable income to spend on cinema going and on home television sets. After several moderate performing films, Papa Ajasco (1984) by Wale Adenuga became the first blockbuster, grossing approximately ₦61,000 (approx. 2015 ₦21,552,673) in three days. A year later, Mosebolatan (1985) by Moses Olaiya also went ahead to gross ₦107,000 (approx. 2015 ₦44,180,499) in five days.

In the early 2000s, Nigerians established television channels dedicated exclusively to local cinema in local languages (mostly English, dialects) such as Africa Magic. This protectionism has enabled the populations of Nigeria but also of sub-Saharan Africa to become accustomed to Nigerian cinema and culture. Over time, this has expanded and several other channels have been created, this time with a bilingual ambition (French, English). Today, some streaming-platforms such as Iroko Tv have already been created to increase the development of the Nollywood industry.

Egypt 

Since 1976, Cairo has held the annual Cairo International Film Festival (CIFF), which is accredited by the International Federation of Film Producers Association. In 1996, the Egyptian Media Production City (EMPC) was inaugurated in 6th of October City south of Cairo, although by 2001, only one of 29 planned studios was operational. Censorship, formerly an obstacle to freedom of expression, has decreased remarkably by 2012, when the Egyptian cinema had begun to tackle boldly issues ranging from sexual issues  to heavy government criticism.

The 1940s, 1950s and the 1960s are generally considered the golden age of Egyptian cinema. As in the West, films responded to the popular imagination, with most falling into predictable genres (happy endings being the norm), and many actors making careers out of playing strongly typed parts. In the words of one critic, "If an Egyptian film intended for popular audiences lacked any of these prerequisites, it constituted a betrayal of the unwritten contract with the spectator, the results of which would manifest themselves in the box office." Since the 1990s, Egypt's cinema has gone in separate directions. Smaller art films attract some international attention but sparse attendance at home. Popular films, often broad comedies such as What A Lie!, and the extremely profitable works of comedian Mohamed Saad, battle to hold audiences either drawn to Western films or, increasingly, wary of the perceived immorality of film.

Iran 

The cinema of Iran (Persian: سینمای ایران) or cinema of Persia refers to the cinema and film industries in Iran which produce a variety of commercial films annually. Iranian art films have garnered international fame and now enjoy a global following.

Along with China, Iran has been lauded as one of the best exporters of cinema in the 1990s, according to Jamsheed Akrami. Some critics now rank Iran as the world's most important national cinema, artistically, with a significance that invites comparison to Italian neorealism and similar movements in past decades. German filmmaker Werner Herzog has praised Iranian cinema as one of the world's most important artistic cinemas.

Japan 

Japan has one of the oldest and largest film industries in the world; as of 2010, it was the fourth largest by number of feature films produced. Movies have been produced in Japan since 1897, when the first foreign cameramen arrived.

In a Sight & Sound list of the best films produced in Asia, Japanese works made up eight of the top 12, with Tokyo Story (1953) ranked number one. Tokyo Story also topped the 2012 Sight & Sound directors' poll of The Top 50 Greatest Films of All Time, dethroning Citizen Kane, while Akira Kurosawa's Seven Samurai (1954) was voted the greatest foreign-language film of all time in BBC's 2018 poll of 209 critics in 43 countries. Japan has won the Academy Award for the Best Foreign Language Film four times (Rashomon, Gate of Hell, Samurai I: Musashi Miyamoto, and Departures), more than any other Asian country.

Korea 

The term cinema of Korea (or Korean cinema) encompasses the motion picture industries of North and South Korea. As with all aspects of Korean life during the past century, the film industry has often been at the mercy of political events, from the late Joseon dynasty to the Korean War to domestic governmental interference. While both countries have relatively robust film industries today, only South Korean films have achieved wide international acclaim. North Korean films tend to portray their communist or revolutionary themes.

South Korean films enjoyed a "Golden age" during the late 1950s, and 1960s. By 2005 South Korea had become one of few nations to watch more domestic than imported films in theaters due largely to laws placing limits on the number of foreign films able to be shown per theater per year. In the theaters, Korean films must be played for 73 days per year since 2006. On cable TV 25% domestic film quota will be reduced to 20% after KOR-US FTA.
The cinema of South Korea had a total box office gross in the country in 2015 of ₩ and had 113,000,000 admissions, 52% of the total admissions.

Hong Kong 

Hong Kong is a filmmaking hub for the Chinese-speaking world (including the worldwide diaspora) and East Asia in general.  For decades it was the third largest motion picture industry in the world (after India and US) and the second largest exporter of films. Despite an industry crisis starting in the mid-1990s and Hong Kong's return to Chinese sovereignty in July 1997 Hong Kong film has retained much of its distinctive identity and continues to play a prominent part on the world cinema stage. Unlike many film industries, Hong Kong has enjoyed little to no direct government support, through either subsidies or import quotas.  It has always been a thoroughly commercial cinema, concentrating on crowd-pleasing genres, like comedy and action, and heavily reliant on formulas, sequels and remakes.  Typically of commercial cinemas, its heart is a highly developed star system, which in this case also features substantial overlap with the pop music industry.

Turkey 
The Turkish film market stands out in the pan-European landscape as the only market where national films regularly outperform US films. In 2013, it had 1.2 million number of admissions and 87 feature films were released. Between 2004 and 2014, the estimated 12.9 million admissions generated on non-national European markets only accounted for 7% of total admissions to Turkish films in Europe (including Turkey). This was the third lowest share among the 30 European markets for which such data are available and clearly illustrates the strong dependence of Turkish films on the domestic market, a feature which is shared by Polish and Russian films.

In 2014, Kış Uykusu (Winter's Sleep) won the Cannes Film Festival Award for Best Film. In 2013, Turkey still ranked behind the Netherlands in terms of box office with just over EUR 200 million as Europe's eight largest box office market ahead of Sweden and Switzerland with a clear gap to the top 6 markets all of which registered GBO between EUR 504 million (Spain) up to over EUR 1 billion in France, the UK, Germany and the Russian Federation. Cinema going is comparatively cheap in Turkey. In 2013 a cinema ticket cost on average EUR 4.0 in Turkey, and this was estimated to be the lowest average ticket price – measured in Euro – in Europe, marginally cheaper than in several Central and Eastern European markets like Croatia, Romania, Lithuania or Bulgaria (subject to exchange rates).

Pakistan 

The cinema of Pakistan, or simply Pakistani cinema, refers to Pakistan's film industry. Most of the feature films shot in Pakistan are in Urdu, the national language, but may also include films in English, the official language, and regional languages such as Punjabi, Pashto, Balochi, and Sindhi. Lahore has been described as the epicentre of Pakistani cinema, giving rise to the term "Lollywood"as portmanteau of Lahore and Hollywood.

Before the separation of Bangladesh, Pakistan had three main film production centres: Lahore, Karachi and Dhaka. The regime of Muhammad Zia-ul-Haq, VCRs, film piracy, the introduction of entertainment taxes, strict laws based upon ultra-conservative jurisprudence, was an obstacle to the industry's growth. Once thriving, the cinema in Pakistan had a sudden collapse in the 1980s and by the 2000s "an industry that once produced an average of 80 films annually was now struggling to even churn out few movies." However, with the boom in the Television Industry in Karachi which gave rise to bigger privately owned media houses led to revival of Pakistan Film Industry. Karachi, now is the biggest production center of Film Industry in Pakistan which produces Urdu, English and Sindhi language Pakistani Cinema. Lahore is the second big film producer now (mostly Urdu and Punjabi movies) followed by Peshawar where mostly Pashto films are produced. Films are also being produced on a very small scale from Islamabad (Urdu and English movies) and Quetta (Balochi movies).Pakistani films are gaining its market in the local cticuit and international markets like Gulf countries, UK-Europe, US-North America and Far-East. Many Pakistani movies made their ways to Oscars' foreign language film category i.e. Jaago Hua Sawera-The Day Shall Dawn (1953), The Veil (Ghoonghat) (1963), Zinda Bhaag (2013), Dukhtar (2014), Moor (2015), Mah-e-Mir (2016), Saawan (2017), Cake (2018), Lal Kabootar (2019). Two Pakistani documentary films won the Oscars' for the best documentary film, these are, Saving Face (2012) and A Girl in the River (2016).  
Pakistani movies especially Urdu movies revolve around family drama, romance, love stories, comedy, thriller, social matters, political issues. In contemporary era some Pakistani films have gained international acclaim, these include, Khuda Kay Liye (In the name of God), Bol, Verna, Zinda Bhaag, Load-Wedding, Wrong Number, Cake, Teefa in Trouble,  Lal Kabootar, Mah-e-Meer, Moor, Baaji.

Punjabi cinema is mostly themed on romance, family drama and action while Pashto cinema revolves around action and tribal feuds.

Major Film Awards include Lux Style Awards, ARY Film Awards, Nigar Awards and National Film Awards.

Bangladesh 

The cinema of Bangladesh is the Bengali language film industry based in Dhaka, Bangladesh. The industry often has been a significant film industry since the early 1970s. The word "Dhollywood" is a portmanteau of the words Dhaka and Hollywood. The dominant style of Bangladeshi cinema is Melodramatic cinema, which developed from 1947 to 1990 and characterizes most films to this day. Cinema was introduced in Bangladesh in 1898 by Bradford Bioscope Company, credited to have arranged the first film release in Bangladesh. Between 1913 and 1914, the first production company named Picture House was opened. A short silent film titled Sukumari (The Good Girl) was the first produced film in the region during 1928. The first full-length film The Last Kiss, was released in 1931. From the separation of Bangladesh from Pakistan, Dhaka is the center of Bangladeshi film industry, and generated the majority share of revenue, production and audiences. The 1960s, 1970s, 1980s and the first half of the 1990s were the golden years for Bangladeshi films as the industry produced many successful films. The Face and the Mask, the first Bengali language Bangladeshi full-length feature film was produced in 1956. Matir Moina, a 2002 film by Tarek Masud, became the first Bangladeshi film to be honored at Cannes Film Festival.

Indonesia 

The biggest film studios in Southeast Asia has been soft opened on 5 November 2011 on 10 hectares of land in Nongsa, Batam Island, Indonesia. Infinite Frameworks (IFW) is a Singapore-based company (closed to Batam Island) which is owned by a consortium with 90 percent of it hold by Indonesian businessman and film producer, Mike Wiluan. In 2010–2011, due to the substantial increase in value added tax applied to foreign films, cinemas no longer had access to many foreign films, including Oscar-winning films. Foreign films include major box offices from the west, and other major film producers of the world. This caused a massive ripple effect on the country's economy. It is assumed that this increased the purchase of unlicensed DVDs. However, even copyright violating DVDs took longer to obtain. The minimum cost to view a foreign film not screened locally, was 1 million Rupiah. This was equivalent to US$100, as it includes a plane ticket to Singapore.

Malaysia 

The cinema of Malaysia consists of feature films produced in Malaysia, shot in the languages English, Tamil, Malay, Mandarin and Cantonese.

Malaysia produces about 60 feature films annually, and between 300 and 400 television dramas and serials a year apart from the in-house productions by the individual television stations. The country also holds its own annual national level film awards, known as the Malaysia Film Festival. There are about 150 cinemas and cineplexes in Malaysia, showing not only local films but also foreign films.

Trinidad and Tobago 

Trinidad and Tobago's film sector began emerging in the late 1950s to early 1960s and by the late 1970s, there were a handful of local productions, both feature film and television. The first full-length feature film to be produced in Trinidad and Tobago was The Right and the Wrong (1970) by Indian director/writer/producer, Harbance Kumar. The screenplay was written by the Trinidadian playwright, Freddie Kissoon. The rest of the 20th century saw a couple more feature films being made in the country, with Bim (1974), being singled out by Bruce Paddington as "one of the most important films to be produced in Trinidad and Tobago ... . and one of the classics of Caribbean cinema." It was one of the first films to feature an almost entirely Trinidadian cast and crew. There was a rise in Trinidadian film production in the 2000s. Films such as Ivan the Terrible (2004), SistaGod (2006), I'm Santana: The Movie (2012) and God Loves the Fighter (2013) were released both locally and internationally. SistaGod had its world premiere at the 2006 Toronto International Film Festival.

The Trinidad and Tobago Film Company is the national agency that was established in 2006 to further development of the film industry. Trinidad and Tobago puts on a number of film festivals which are organized by different committees and organizations. These include the Secondary Schools Short Film Festival and Smartphone Film Festival organized by Trinidad and Tobago Film Company. There is also an annual Trinidad and Tobago Film Festival which runs for two weeks in the latter half of September.

Nepal 

Nepali film does not have a very long film history, but the industry has its own place in the cultural heritage of the country. It is often referred to as 'Nepali Chalchitra' (which translates to "Nepali films" in English). The terms Kollywood and Kallywood are also used, as a portmanteau of "Kathmandu" and "Hollywood"; "Kollywood" however is more frequently used to refer to Tamil cinema. Chhakka Panja has been considered the highest-grossing film of all time in Nepali film industry and Kohinoor the second highest. The Nepali films The Black Hen (2015) and Kagbeni (2006) received international acclaim. The Nepali feature film White Sun (Seto Surya) received the Best Film award at the 27th Singapore International Film Festival (SGIFF) in 2016.

History 

Les frères Lumière released the first projection with the Cinematograph, in Paris on 28 December 1895. The French film industry in the late 19th century and early 20th century was the world's most important. Auguste and Louis Lumière invented the cinématographe and their L'Arrivée d'un train en gare de La Ciotat in Paris in 1895 is considered by many historians as the official birth of cinematography.
The first feature film to be made was the 1906 Australian silent The Story of the Kelly Gang, an account of the notorious gang led by Ned Kelly that was directed and produced by the Melburnians Dan Barry and Charles Tait. It ran, continuously, for eighty minutes.

In the early 1910s, the film industry had fully emerged with D.W. Griffith's The Birth of a Nation. Also in the early 1900s motion picture production companies from New York and New Jersey started moving to California because of the good weather and longer days. Although electric lights existed at that time, none were powerful enough to adequately expose film; the best source of illumination for movie production was natural sunlight. Besides the moderate, dry climate, they were also drawn to the state because of its open spaces and wide variety of natural scenery.

Introduction of film industry 
In 1900, Charles Pathé began film production under the Pathé-Frères brand, with Ferdinand Zecca hired to actually make the films. By 1905, Pathé was the largest film company in the world, a position it retained until World War I. Léon Gaumont began film production in 1896, supervised by Alice Guy.

Besides American Mutoscope, there were also numerous smaller producers in the United States, and some of them established a long-term presence in the new century. American Vitagraph, one of these minor producers, built studios in Brooklyn, and expanded its operations in 1905.

The first successful permanent theatre showing only films was "The Nickelodeon", which was opened in Pittsburgh in 1905. By then, there were enough films several minutes long available to fill a programme running for at least half an hour, and which could be changed weekly when the local audience became bored with it. Other exhibitors in the United States quickly followed suit, and within two years, there were 8,000 of these nickelodeons in operation across the United States. The American experience led to a worldwide boom in the production and exhibition of films from 1906 onwards.

Movie theaters became popular entertainment venues and social hubs in the early 20th century, much like cabarets and other theaters.

By 1907, purpose-built cinemas for motion pictures were being opened across the United States, Britain and France. The films were often shown with the accompaniment of music provided by a pianist, though there could be more musicians. There were also a very few larger cinemas in some of the biggest cities. Initially, the majority of films in the programmes were Pathé films, but this changed fairly quickly as the American companies cranked up production. The programme was made up of just a few films, and the show lasted around 30 minutes. The reel of film, of maximum length , which usually contained one individual film, became the standard unit of film production and exhibition in this period. The programme was changed twice or more a week, but went up to five changes of programme a week after a couple of years. In general, cinemas were set up in the established entertainment districts of the cities. In 1907, Pathé began renting their films to cinemas through film exchanges rather than selling the films outright.

The litigation over patents between all the major American film-making companies had continued, and at the end of 1908 they decided to pool their patents and form a trust to use them to control the American film business. The companies concerned were Pathé, Edison, Biograph, Vitagraph, Lubin, Selig, Essanay, Kalem, and the Kleine Optical Company, a major importer of European films. The George Eastman company, the only manufacturer of film stock in the United States, was also part of the combine, which was called the Motion Picture Patents Company (MPPC), and Eastman Kodak agreed to only supply the members with film stock. License fees for distributing and projecting films were extracted from all distributors and exhibitors. The producing companies that were part of the trust were allocated production quotas (two reels, i.e. films, a week for the biggest ones, one reel a week for the smaller), which were supposed to be enough to fill the programmes of the licensed exhibitors. But the market was bigger than that, for although 6,000 exhibitors signed with the MPPC, about 2,000 others did not. A minority of the exchanges (i.e. distributors) stayed outside the MPPC, and in 1909 these independent exchanges immediately began to fund new film producing companies. By 1911 there were enough independent and foreign films available to programme all the shows of the independent exhibitors, and in 1912 the independents had nearly half of the market. The MPPC had effectively been defeated in its plan to control the whole United States market, and the government anti-trust action, which only now started against the MPPC, was not really necessary to defeat it.

In the early 20th century, before Hollywood, the United States motion picture industry was mainly based in Fort Lee, New Jersey across the Hudson River from New York City. In need of a winter headquarters, moviemakers were attracted to Jacksonville, Florida due to its warm climate, exotic locations, excellent rail access, and cheaper labor, earning the city the title of "The Winter Film Capital of the World." New York-based Kalem Studios was the first to open a permanent studio in Jacksonville in 1908. Over the course of the next decade, more than 30 silent film companies established studios in town, including Metro Pictures (later MGM), Edison Studios, Majestic Films, King-Bee Film Company, Vim Comedy Company, Norman Studios, Gaumont Studios and the Lubin Manufacturing Company. The first motion picture made in Technicolor and the first feature-length color movie produced in the United States, The Gulf Between, was also filmed on location in Jacksonville in 1917.

Jacksonville was especially important to the African American film industry. One notable individual in this regard is the European American producer Richard Norman, who created a string of films starring black actors in the vein of Oscar Micheaux and the Lincoln Motion Picture Company. In contrast to the degrading parts offered in certain white films such as The Birth of a Nation, Norman and his contemporaries sought to create positive stories featuring African Americans in what he termed "splendidly assuming different roles."

Jacksonville's mostly conservative residents, however, objected to the hallmarks of the early movie industry, such as car chases in the streets, simulated bank robberies and fire alarms in public places, and even the occasional riot. In 1917, conservative Democrat John W. Martin was elected mayor on the platform of taming the city's movie industry. By that time, southern California was emerging as the major movie production center, thanks in large part to the move of film pioneers like William Selig and D.W. Griffith to the area. These factors quickly sealed the demise of Jacksonville as a major film destination.

Another factor for the industry's move west was that up until 1913, most American film production was still carried out around New York, but due to the monopoly of Thomas A. Edison, Inc.'s film patents and its litigious attempts to preserve it, many filmmakers moved to Southern California, starting with Selig in 1909. The sunshine and scenery was important for the production of Westerns, which came to form a major American film genre with the first cowboy stars, G.M. Anderson ("Broncho Billy") and Tom Mix. Selig pioneered the use of (fairly) wild animals from a zoo for a series of exotic adventures, with the actors being menaced or saved by the animals. Kalem Company sent film crews to places in America and abroad to film stories in the actual places they were supposed to have happened. Kalem also pioneered the female action heroine from 1912, with Ruth Roland playing starring roles in their Westerns.

In France, Pathé retained its dominant position, followed still by Gaumont, and then other new companies that appeared to cater to the film boom. A film company with a different approach was Film d'Art. Film d'Art was set up at the beginning of 1908 to make films of a serious artistic nature. Their declared programme was to make films using only the best dramatists, artists and actors. The first of these was L'Assassinat du Duc de Guise (The Assassination of the Duc de Guise), a historical subject set in the court of Henri III. This film used leading actors from the Comédie-Française, and had a special accompanying score written by Camille Saint-Saëns. The other French majors followed suit, and this wave gave rise to the English-language description of films with artistic pretensions aimed at a sophisticated audience as "art films". By 1910, the French film companies were starting to make films as long as two, or even three reels, though most were still one reel long. This trend was followed in Italy, Denmark, and Sweden.

In Britain, the Cinematograph Act 1909 was the first primary legislation to specifically regulate the film industry. Film exhibitions often took place in temporary venues and the use of highly flammable cellulose nitrate for film, combined with limelight illumination, created a significant fire hazard. The Act specified a strict building code which required, amongst other things, that the projector be enclosed within a fire resisting enclosure.

The Babelsberg Studio near Berlin in Germany was the first large-scale film studio in the world, founded 1912, and the forerunner to Hollywood with its several establishments of large studios in the early 20th century.

Hollywood 

The first movie studio in Hollywood area, Nestor Studios, was founded in 1911 by Al Christie for David Horsley. Other East Coast studios had already moved production to Los Angeles.  Over time, Hollywood came to be so strongly associated with the film industry that the word "Hollywood" is now used colloquially to refer to the entire American film industry.

In 1913 Cecil B. DeMille, in association with Jesse Lasky, leased a barn with studio facilities in Hollywood where The Squaw Man (1914) was made. It is now the location of the Hollywood Heritage Museum.

The Charlie Chaplin Studios were built in 1917.  The site was also used by Kling Studios,  for the Superman TV series; Red Skelton, who used the sound stages for his CBS TV variety show; and CBS, which filmed the TV series Perry Mason there.  It has also been owned by Herb Alpert's A&M Records and Tijuana Brass Enterprises.  It is currently The Jim Henson Company, home of the Muppets. In 1969 The Los Angeles Cultural Heritage Board named it a historical cultural monument.

The noted Hollywood Sign originally read "Hollywoodland". It was erected in 1923 to advertise a new housing development in the hills above Hollywood. In 1949 the Hollywood Chamber of Commerce stepped in and removed the last four letters and repaired the others. It is a registered trademark and cannot be used without the permission of the Hollywood Chamber of Commerce.

The first Academy Awards presentation ceremony took place on 16 May 1929.

The period between the years 1927 (the effective end of the silent era) to 1948 is considered the age of the "Hollywood studio system", or the Golden Age of Hollywood.  In a landmark 1948 court decision, the Supreme Court ruled that movie studios could not own theaters and play only the movies of their studio and movie stars; thus an era of Hollywood history ended.

Indian  cinema 

Bollywood is the Hindi-language film industry based in Mumbai (formerly known as Bombay), Maharashtra, India. The term is often incorrectly used to refer to the whole of Indian cinema; however, it is only a part of the total Indian film industry, which includes other production centres producing films in multiple languages. Bollywood is the largest film producer in India and one of the largest centres of film production in the world.

Bollywood is formally referred to as Hindi cinema. Linguistically, Bollywood films tend to use vernacular Hindustani, mutually intelligible to self-identified speakers of both Hindi and Urdu, while modern Bollywood films also increasingly incorporate elements of Hinglish.

The Wrestlers (1899) and The Man and His Monkeys (1899), directed and produced by Harischandra Sakharam Bhatawdekar (H. S. Bhatavdekar), were the first two films made by Indian filmmakers, which were both short films. He was also the first Indian filmmaker to direct and produce the first documentary and news related film, titled The Landing of Sir M.M. Bhownuggree.

The 1930s and 1940s were tumultuous times: India was buffeted by the Great Depression, World War II, the Indian independence movement, and the violence of the Partition. Most Bollywood films were unabashedly escapist, but there were also a number of filmmakers who tackled tough social issues, or used the struggle for Indian independence as a backdrop for their plots.

In 1937 Ardeshir Irani, of Alam Ara fame, made the first colour film in Hindi, Kisan Kanya. The next year, he made another colour film, a version of Mother India.

Following India's independence, the period from the late 1940s to the early 1960s is regarded by film historians as the "Golden Age" of Hindi cinema. Defining key figures during this time included Raj Kapoor, Guru Dutt, Mehboob Khan, and Dilip Kumar.

The 1970s was when the name "Bollywood" was coined, and when the quintessential conventions of commercial Bollywood films were established. Key to this was the emergence of the masala film genre, which combines elements of multiple genres (action, comedy, romance, drama, melodrama, musical). The masala film was pioneered in the early 1970s by filmmaker Nasir Hussain, along with screenwriter duo Salim–Javed, pioneering the Bollywood blockbuster format.

Tollywood is the Bengali language Film Industry of India. Started by Royal Bioscope Company in 1898 by Hiralal Sen, along with Matilal Sen, Deboki Lal Sen, and Bholanath Gupta. Combining live theater performances of actors, the Bengali industry was notable for using sound as an important part of the drama in its Bioscope format whose cinematic language was extremely different from Western silent films. This was followed by Jamshedji Framji Madan of the Elphinstone Bioscope Company who also controlled Madan Theatre Company. J J Madan became managing director of Madan Theatres after the death of his father in 1923 and Madan Theatres reached a peak in late 1920s when it owned 127 theaters and controlled half of the country's box office. Madan Theatres produced a number of popular and landmark films till 1937, parallel to works of '20s Bengali stars like Dhirendra Nath Ganguly who started the Indo British Film Co. – the first Bengali-owned production company in 1918. The rise of the industry followed in 1930s to 1940s when a diversity of films were made. Many prints were destroyed by fire. The prints and records of films from 1937 to 1947 films were majorly destroyed but this period in Bengal served as the age of political films in India which was supremely influential for the struggle for Indian Independence. After 1947, The industry saw a new era of creative studio-system collaborators who made films under the name of Agradoot. This saw a renaissance of commercial films and musicals where stars like Uttam Kumar and Suchitra Sen mesmerized the audience with their captivating screen presence and subdued performances. Ritwick Ghatak, Satyajit Ray, Tapan Sinha, Mrinal Sen and Rituparno Ghosh were the other notable directors whose works influenced world cinema beyond an incomparable degree. The name of the industry was coined after the place Tollygunge, which also served as a cheeky tribute to Hollywood.

Cairo

The cinema of Egypt refers to the flourishing film industry based in Cairo which is known to be the Hollywood of the MENA region.  In 1896, a limited number of silent films was made in Egypt beginning in 1896; 1927's Laila was notable as the first full-length feature. Cairo's film industry became a regional force with the coming of sound. Between 1930 and 1936, various small studios produced at least 44 feature films. In 1936, Studio Misr, financed by industrialist Talaat Harb, emerged as the leading Egyptian equivalent to Hollywood's major studios, a role the company retained for three decades.

Historians disagree in determining the beginning of cinema in Egypt. Some say in 1896, when the first film was watched in Egypt, while others date the beginning from 20 June 1907 with a short documentary film about the visit of Khedive Abbas Hilmi II to the Institute of Mursi Abul-Abbas in Alexandria. In 1917, the director Mohammed Karim established a production company in Alexandria. The company produced two films: Dead Flowers and Honor the Bedouin, which were shown in the city of Alexandria in early 1918.

Since 1976, the capital has held the annual Cairo International Film Festival, which has been accredited by the International Federation of Film Producers Associations. There is also another 12 festivals. Of the more than 4,000 short and feature-length films made in MENA region since 1908, more than three-quarters were Egyptian films. Egyptian films are typically spoken in the Egyptian Arabic dialect. Since then, more than 4,000 films have been produced in Egypt, three quarters of the total Arab production. Historian Samir Kassir notes (2004) that Misr Studios in particular, "despite their ups and downs, were to make Cairo the third capital of the world's film industry, after Hollywood and Bombay but ahead of Italy's Cinecittà." Egypt is the most productive country in the Middle East in the field of film production, and the one with the most developed media system.

Nollywood

Nollywood is a sobriquet that originally referred to the Nigerian film industry. The origin of the term dates back to the early 2000s, traced to an article in The New York Times. Due to the history of evolving meanings and contexts, there is no clear or agreed-upon definition for the term, which has made it a subject of several controversies.
The origin of the term "Nollywood" remains unclear; Jonathan Haynes traced the earliest usage of the word to a 2002 article by Matt Steinglass in the New York Times, where it was used to describe Nigerian cinema. Charles Igwe noted that Norimitsu Onishi also used the name in a September 2002 article he wrote for the New York Times. The term continues to be used in the media to refer to the Nigerian film industry, with its definition later assumed to be a portmanteau of the words "Nigeria" and "Hollywood", the American major film hub.

Definition of which films are considered Nollywood has always been a subject of debate. Alex Eyengho defined Nollywood as "the totality of activities taking place in the Nigerian film industry, be it in English, Yoruba, Hausa, Igbo, Itsekiri, Edo, Efik, Ijaw, Urhobo or any other of the over 300 Nigerian languages". He further stated that "the historical trajectory of Nollywood started since the pre and post independent Nigeria, with the theatrical (stage) and cinematic (celluloid) efforts of the likes of Chief Hubert Ogunde, Chief Amata, Baba Sala, Ade Love, Eddie Ugbomah and a few others".
The Influence of the Nigerian movie industry often referred to informally as Nollywood has influence all Africa countries.

By the end of 2013, the film industry reportedly hit a record-breaking revenue of ₦1.72 trillion (US$4.1 billion). As of 2014, the industry was worth ₦853.9 billion (US$5.1 billion) 
Making It The Third Most Valuable Film Industry In The World
behind the United States and India. It contributed about 1.4% to Nigeria's economy; this was attributed to the increase in the number of quality films produced and more formal distribution methods.

Economics 

Profitability of a film studio is crucially dependent on picking the right film projects and involving the right management and creative teams (cast, direction, visual design, score, photography, costume, set design, editing, and many additional specialties), but it also depends heavily on choosing the right scale and approach to film promotion, control over receipts through technologies such as digital rights management (DRM), sophisticated accounting practices, and management of ancillary revenue streams; in the extreme, for a major media franchise centered on film, the film might itself be only one large component of many large contributions to total franchise revenue.

The film industry is a brutally competitive winner-take-all market driven by wildly fluctuating "nonlinear processes".  Box office revenue is highly concentrated in a small number of very successful films, and film industry market share is also highly concentrated in the film studios lucky enough to make such films.  But the market is "extremely volatile" and it is impossible to predict in advance who will become the market winner at any given moment "or how long their domination will last". The dominant films and film studios "change places dramatically and often".

Statistics

Largest industries by number of film productions 
The following is a list of the top 15 countries by the number of feature films (fiction, animation and documentary) produced, according to the UNESCO Institute for Statistics, unless otherwise noted.

Largest markets by box office revenue 
The following countries are the largest box office markets in terms of the gross box office revenue, according to the THEME Report 2020 by the MPA (Motion Picture Association).

Largest markets by number of box office admissions 
The following countries are the largest box office markets in terms of the number of tickets sold in 2019.

Criticism

Censorship 
Economic censorship happens when a company, industry or country takes steps to ensure profitability, usually by self-censoring content to please the group wielding their economic influence. That group can be political in nature such as the boycott of individuals or the banning or taxing by governments of certain products. This tool tends to have broader reach beyond the borders of a government than pure political censorship. Examples include Hollywood self-censoring any negative depictions of Nazis for most of the 1930's in order to maintain access to German audiences and avoid upsetting anti-semites at home, or major studios self-censoring any negative depictions of China or its ruling party after 1997 in order to maintain access to Chinese audiences.

Direct political censorship occurs mostly inside authoritarian regimes and their allies, such as in China or Russia.

Covert advertising 
Native advertising is information designed to persuade in more subtle ways than classic propaganda. A modern example common in the United States is copaganda, in which TV shows display unrealistically flattering portrayals of law enforcement, in part to borrow equipment and get their assistance in blocking off streets to more easily film on location. Other reputation laundering accusations have been leveled in the entertainment industry, including the burnishing the image of  mafias.

Product placement also has been a point of criticism, with the tobacco industry promoting smoking on screen. The Centers for Disease Control cites that 18% of teen smokers wouldn't start smoking if films with smoking were automatically given an 'R' rating, which would save 1 million lives.

See also 

 List of cinema of the world
 List of entertainment industry dynasties
 Independent film
 Outline of film
 Television

Footnotes

Bibliography 
 Allen J. Scott (2005) On Hollywood: The Place The Industry, Princeton University Press
 Robertson, Patrick (1988) The Guinness Book of Movie Facts & Feats. London: Guinness Publishing Limited
 Arnab Jan Deka (27 October 1996) Fathers of Indian Cinema Bhatawdekar and Torney, Dainik Asam
 Sanjit Narwekar (1995) Marathi Cinema : In Retrospect, Maharashtra Film, Stage & Cultural Development Corporation Ltd
 Firoze Rangoonwalla (1979) A Pictorial History of Indian Cinema, The Hamlyn Publishing Group Limited
 Barkin, Jordan. 25 April 2021. "When you enjoy Oscar Night, America Wins". USA Today.

External links 

Movie Making Manual wikibook

 
Economics of the arts and literature
Industries (economics)